Lhorong may refer to:

Lhorong County, county in Tibet
Lhorong Town, town in Tibet